Fingersmith or finger-smith is slang for a midwife or pickpocket.

Used in a 1977 short story, "The Hitchhiker" by Roald Dahl and as the title of Sarah Waters's 2002 novel: "Fingersmith".

References

Crime